Justice Abdul Jabbar Khan (30 June 1902 – 23 April 1984) was the 6th Speaker of the National Assembly of Pakistan. He was preceded by Fazlul Qadir Chaudhry.

Early life 
He was born on 1 January 1902 in Baher char, Barisal. He graduated from Barisal Zila School in 1919 and two years later from Brojomohun College. He did his undergraduate and graduate studies from the Dhaka University.

Career 
In 1929 he joined the judicial branch of Bengal Civil Service. In his career he served as the subordinate judge, additional district judge and district judge and a justice of the Dhaka High Court. He started his political career in 1962 with the Muslim league and in 1964 he was made the president of the East Pakistan wing of the Muslim League. In 1965 he was elected to the Pakistan National Assembly from Barisal. he went on to be elected Speaker of the National Assembly.
In 1957 President Iskander Mirza elevated him as Judge of the East Pakistan High Court. He resigned to join politics in 1962 and got elected as MNA and was Speaker of the National Assembly from 1965-69. He served as acting President on several occasions. On resigning in 1969, President Ayub Khan did not hand over power to him but instead abrogated the constitution and invited Gen Yahya Khan to declare martial law leading to the creation of Bangladesh.

Justice Feroz Nana was father of Ms Anita Ghulam Ali while Justice Mushtak Ali Kazi was father in law of Justice Agha Rafiq Khan former Chief Justice of the Federal Shariat Court.

Acting President of Pakistan
Abdul Jabbar Khan was the acting President of Pakistan from 1965–1965, when President Ayub Khan (general) went abroad for medical treatment.
He resigned to join politics in 1962 and got elected as MNA and was Speaker of the National Assembly from 1965-69. He served as acting President on several occasions. On resigning in 1969.

Death 
He died on 23 April 1984 in Dhaka, Bangladesh.

References

1902 births
1984 deaths
Speakers of the National Assembly of Pakistan
People from Barisal District
Pakistani MNAs 1965–1969